Miss Venus is a 1921 German silent film directed by Ludwig Czerny and starring Ada Svedin, Manny Ziener and Charles Willy Kayser.

The film's sets were designed by the art director Robert Neppach.

Cast
 Ada Svedin as Maud Goodin
 Manny Ziener as Thompson
 Charles Willy Kayser as Bobby Parker
 Johanna Ewald as Huckelbery
 Felicitas Scholz
 Mary Cepalek
 Friedrich Berger
 Herta Bibo
 Ingo Brandt
 Willy Fritsch
 Willy Godlewski
 Adalbert Lenz
 Berthold Rose
 Hans Wassmann

References

Bibliography
 Bock, Hans-Michael & Bergfelder, Tim. The Concise CineGraph. Encyclopedia of German Cinema. Berghahn Books, 2009.

External links

1921 films
Films of the Weimar Republic
German silent feature films
Films directed by Ludwig Czerny
German black-and-white films
1920s German films